In mathematics, Dirichlet integrals play an important role in distribution theory. We can see the Dirichlet integral in terms of distributions.

One of those is the improper integral of the sinc function over the positive real line,

Lobachevsky's Dirichlet integral formula 

If the integral  is taken to be an improper Riemann integral, we have Lobachevsky's Dirichlet integral formula

 

Moreover, we have the following identity as an extension of the Lobachevsky Dirichlet integral formula

 

As an application, take . Then

References 

 Hardy, G. H., The Integral  The Mathematical Gazette, Vol. 5, No. 80 (June–July 1909), pp. 98–103 
 Dixon, A. C., Proof That  The Mathematical Gazette, Vol. 6, No. 96 (January 1912), pp. 223–224. 

Linear operators in calculus
Schwartz distributions